The Diocese of Santiago de Cabo Verde is a Latin Church ecclesiastical territory or diocese of the Catholic Church in Cape Verde. It covers the islands of Maio, Santiago, Fogo, and Brava (the Sotavento Islands). Its cathedra is within the Pró-catedral Nossa Senhora da Graça in Praia, Santiago. The diocese is immediately exempt to the Holy See and is not part of any ecclesiastical province.

History
The Diocese of Santiago de Cabo Verde was created on January 31, 1533 as a suffragan of the Archdiocese of Funchal (Azores, Portugal) by Pope Clement VII. Its seat was Ribeira Grande, on Santiago. Bishop Francisco de la Cruz started construction of a cathedral in Ribeira Grande in 1556. Ribeira Grande went into decline in the 18th century, and the seat was moved to Ribeira Brava on São Nicolau in 1786, where it stayed until 1943. A seminary and an episcopal palace were built there.

Until September 4, 1940 the diocese covered not only the Cape Verde islands, but also Portuguese Guinea on the African mainland. Portuguese Guinea became a Mission sui iuris, the later Roman Catholic Diocese of Bissau. Since November 2003 the (northern) Barlavento Islands form the separate Roman Catholic Diocese of Mindelo, and the Diocese of Santiago de Cabo Verde only covers the (southern) Sotavento Islands.

Bishops

The bishops of the Diocese of Santiago de Cabo Verde:
 Braz Neto, OFM (31 January 1533 – 9 February 1538)
 João Parvi (23 September 1538 – 29 November 1546)
 Sede vacante (29 November 1546 – 18 August 1553)
 Francisco de la Cruz, OSA (18 August 1553 – 19 January 1571)
 Bartolomeu Leitão (6 February 1572 – 9 February 1587)
 Pedro Brandão, OCarm (8 August 1588 – 14 July 1608)
 Luis Pereira de Miranda (10 November 1608 – May 1610)
 Sebastião de Ascensão, OP (18 April 1611 – 17 March 1614)
 Manuel Afonso de Guerra (24 February 1616 – 8 March 1624)
 Lorenzo Garro (18 August 1625 – 1 November 1646)
 Sede vacante (1 November 1646 – 16 May 1672)
 Fabio dos Reis Fernandes, OCarm (16 May 1672 – 8 February 1674)
 Antonio de São Dionysio, OFM (2 December 1675 – 12 September 1684)
 Victorino do Porto, OFM (12 May 1687 – 21 January 1705)
 Francisco a São Agostinho, TOR (24 September 1708 – 8 May 1719)
 José a Santa Maria de Jesus Azevedo Leal, OFM (21 February 1721 – 7 June 1736)
 João de Faro, OFM (3 September 1738 – 21 July 1741)
 João de Moreira, OFM (26 November 1742 – 13 August 1747)
 Sede vacante (13 August 1747 – 29 January 1753)
 Pedro Jacinto Valente, O. do Cristo (29 January 1753 – 19 January 1774)
 Sede vacante (19 January 1775 – 1 March 1779)
 Francisco de São Simão, OFM (1 March 1779 – 10 August 1783)
 Cristoforo a São Boaventura, OFM (1785.02.14 – 1798.04.29)
 Sede vacante (29 April 1798 – 24 May 1802)
 Silvestre Santa Maria, OFM (24 May 1802 – 22 November 1813)
 Sede vacante (22 November 1813 – 21 January 1820)
 Geronimo do Barco, OFM (21 January 1820 – 27 December 1831)
 Sede vacante (27 December 1831 – 31 May 1845)
 Patrício Xavier de Moura, OSA (31 May 1845 – 15 April 1859), appointed Bishop of Funchal, Portugal
 João Crisóstomo de Amorim Pessoa, OFM Ref. (8 June 1859 – 22 March 1861), appointed Archbishop of Goa, India
 Sede vacante (22 March 1861 – 25 September 1865)
 José Luís Alves Feijó, O.SS.T. (25 September 1865 – 26 June 1871), appointed  Bishop of Bragança e Miranda, Portugal
 José Dias Correia de Carvalho (26 June 1871 – 9 August 1883), appointed Bishop of Viseu, Portugal
 Joaquim Augusto de Barros (27 March 1884 – 1 March 1904)
 António Moutinho (14 November 1904 – 4 March 1909)
 José Alves Martins (10 March 1910 – 15 November 1935)
 Joaquim Rafael Maria d'Assunção Pitinho, OFM (15 November 1935 – 5 May 1940)
 Faustino Moreira dos Santos, CSSp (28 January 1941 – 27 July 1955)
 José Filípe do Carmo Colaço (28 March 1956 – 21 April 1975)
 Paulino do Livramento Évora, CSSp (21 April 1975 – 22 July 2009)
 Arlindo Gomes Furtado (22 July 2009 – ), elevated to Cardinal in 2015

See also 
Catholic Church in Cape Verde

Sources
 Catholic Hierarchy

References

 
Roman Catholic dioceses in Cape Verde
Religious organizations established in 1533
Roman Catholic dioceses established in the 16th century
1533 establishments in the Portuguese Empire